Suffren was a predreadnought battleship built for the  (French Navy) in the first decade of the twentieth century. Completed in 1902, the ship was assigned to the Escadre de la Méditerranée (Mediterranean Squadron) for most of her career and often served as a flagship. She had an eventful career as she twice collided with French ships and twice had propeller shafts break before the start of World War I in 1914. Suffren was assigned to join the naval operations off the Dardanelles, where she participated in a series of attacks on the Ottoman fortifications guarding the straits.

She was moderately damaged during the fighting on 18 March 1915 and had to be sent to Toulon for repairs. Upon their completion the ship returned to provide gunfire support for the Allied forces during the Gallipoli Campaign. Suffren provided covering fire as the Allies withdrew from the peninsula and accidentally sank one of the evacuation ships. After repairs the ship was assigned to the French squadron tasked to prevent any interference by the Greeks with Allied operations on the Salonica front. While en route to Lorient for a refit, Suffren was torpedoed off Lisbon by an Imperial German submarine on 26 November 1916 and sank with all hands.

Design and description
The three battleships of the  that had been authorized in 1893 were still building when the Navy Minister,  (Vice Admiral) Armand Besnard, was able to get the Chamber of Deputies to authorize the battleship  in 1897 to an improved Charlemagne design. The Chamber authorized another battleship the following year and Besnard, not wishing to delay construction for the time required for an entirely new design, requested an enlarged and improved version of Iéna.

Suffren was intended to have only modest improvements in armament and armour, but the number of improvements grew as the project was discussed by the Conseil des travaux de la Marine (Board of Construction) so that she was essentially a new design, retaining only some of Iénas layout. The biggest changes were that the bulk of the secondary armament was mounted in turrets, rather than Iénas casemates, and the stowage of shells for the main armament was increased from 45 to 60 rounds per gun.

General characteristics

Suffren was fitted with bilge keels to reduce her rolling. Her crew numbered 31 officers and 637 men as a private ship and 42 officers and 700 sailors as a flagship.

Propulsion
Suffren was powered by three Indret vertical triple-expansion steam engines, each driving one propeller shaft. Suffren carried  of fuel oil to be sprayed on the coal to improve its burn rate. The ship's 80-volt electrical power was provided by two 600-ampere and three 1,200-ampere dynamos.

Armament
Like Iéna, Suffren carried her main armament of four 40-calibre Canon de  Modèle 1893/96 guns in two twin-gun turrets, one each fore and aft of the superstructure. The turrets were traversed by electric motors, but were elevated and depressed by hand. The guns were loaded at an angle of −5° and they had a maximum elevation of +15°. They fired  armour-piercing projectiles at the rate of roughly one round per minute. Suffren carried 60 shells for each gun with each turret holding ready-use racks for 22 projectiles.

The ship's secondary armament consisted of ten 45-calibre Canon de  Modèle 1893/96 guns. Six of these were mounted in single-gun turrets on each side of the superstructure and the remaining four guns were positioned below them on the upper deck in individual casemates that were sponsoned out over the tumblehome of the sides. Their theoretical rate of fire was between two and three rounds per minute. Suffren carried 200 shells for each gun. She also carried eight 45-calibre Canon de  Modèle 1893 guns in shielded mounts on the shelter deck and on the superstructure. Their maximum rate of fire was four rounds per minute. The ship carried 2,000 shells for these guns.

For defence against torpedo boats, Suffren mounted twenty-two 50-calibre Canon de  Modèle 1885 Hotchkiss guns. They were positioned in the fighting tops and on the superstructure. Their theoretical maximum rate of fire was fifteen rounds per minute, but only seven rounds per minute sustained. Suffren carried 16,500 rounds for these guns. Two  Modèle 1885 Hotchkiss guns were also mounted on the upper bridge.

The ship was equipped with four  torpedo tubes on the broadside. Two of these were submerged, abaft the forward turret, and fixed at a 30° angle to the side. The two above-water tubes could traverse 80°. Normally Suffren carried twelve Modèle 1892 torpedoes, of which four were training models.

Armour
Above this was a strake of special-steel armour that extended from the bow to the aft transverse bulkhead below the aft main-gun turret. This armour was backed by a highly subdivided cofferdam intended to reduce flooding from any penetrating hits as its compartments were filled by water-resistant "bricks" of dried Zostera seaweed. The outer sides of the casemates were protected by special-steel plates 110 millimetres thick.

The armoured deck consisted of  mild-steel plates laid over two  plates. The splinter deck beneath it comprised two layers of  plates.

Construction and career

Prewar
Suffren, named after  Pierre André de Suffren de Saint-Tropez, was ordered on 21 April 1898 from the Arsenal de Brest. She was laid down on 5 January 1899 and launched on 25 July of the same year. Her fitting-out was delayed by the late delivery of fittings and armour. Suffren began her sea trials in November 1903, but was not commissioned until 3 February 1904. The first three were training shells that knocked splinters off the armour plate. The last two shells, fired with full charges, cracked the plate, but Suffrens turret was fully operational, as was her Germain electrical fire-control system, and the sheep were unharmed. One splinter struck Masséna above her armour belt and left a 15-centimetre sized hole in her hull. Another  splinter landed within a few metres of the Naval Minister, Camille Pelletan, who was observing the trials.

When Suffren was commissioned in Brest, she was assigned to the Escadre de la Méditerranée shortly afterwards. After arriving in Toulon, she became the flagship of its commander,  Palma Gourdon, on 24 February. Two months later she carried the President of France, Émile Loubet, on a state visit to Naples. Another problem was that the centre engine and its propeller shaft tended to overheat. Gourdon was relieved by  Charles Touchard on 4 October 1905. During fleet exercises off the Îles des Hyères on 5 February 1906, Suffren accidentally rammed the submarine  when the latter miscalculated the fleet's movements while manoeuvring into firing position. This was enough, however, to breach two compartments abreast the ship's starboard engine room and she had to be docked for emergency repairs. Bonites bow was crushed and several of her ballast tanks were ripped open. Only by rapidly dropping her weighted keel was the submarine able to avoid sinking. No casualties were suffered by either vessel. During the summer of 1906 Suffrens above-water torpedo tubes were removed. She then participated in an international fleet review in Marseille on 16 September.

She was drydocked adjacent to Iéna on 12 March 1907 at Toulon when the latter ship's magazine exploded. Burning fragments started a small fire aboard Suffren, but she was not otherwise damaged by the explosion and participated in the annual fleet manoeuvres that began on 1 July. By 5 November, the ship had been replaced as flagship by the semi-dreadnought , although she remained assigned to the 1re Division cuirassée (1st Battle Division). In early 1908 a  Barr and Stroud rangefinder was mounted on the navigation bridge. Suffren was transferred to the 3e Division cuirassée in July. While a new shaft was ordered from Indret, Iénas salvaged corresponding shaft was used with such success that the ship's engineers requested to keep it in place and save the new shaft as a spare. This proposal was rejected by the Naval Ministry and the shafts were exchanged. The opportunity was also taken to rework the centre propeller shaft's mounting so that it would overheat less often. In 1909 the battleships of the Escadre de la Méditerranée were reorganised into two Escadre de ligne (battle squadrons), each with a pair of three-ship divisions; the 3e Division cuirassée now assigned to the 2e Escadre de ligne. Suffren, as the most modern of the predreadnoughts, was often attached to the 1re Escadre de ligne to replace ships that were refitting or under repair. In November 1910 the starboard propeller shaft broke and the propeller was lost in deep water. No shaft was immediately available so Suffren had to wait three months for repairs; her boilers were overhauled while a new one was manufactured. On 14 February 1911 the port anchor chain broke while Suffren was conducting towing exercises with two other battleships, killing one sailor and injuring two others. The ship participated in a naval review near Toulon on 4 September. The Escadre de la Méditerranée was renamed the 1er Armée Navale (1st Naval Army) on 31 October as the Marine Nationale concentrated its forces in the Mediterranean.

When the magazines of the semi-dreadnought  exploded in Toulon on 25 September 1911, flying debris from the explosion killed four men aboard Suffren. The ship was reassigned to the 2e Division cuirassée of the 2e Escadre de ligne as a replacement for the destroyed battleship. She was transferred to the 1re Division cuirassée of the 3e Escadre de ligne on 14 March 1913 and became the flagship of  Laurent Marin-Darbel, commander of the Escadre de ligne, four days later. The annual manoeuvres of the 1er Armée Navale began on 19 May; when they were concluded the ships were reviewed by President Raymond Poincaré. During a fleet exercise on 28 May, Suffren accidentally rammed the battleship ; the latter ship was undamaged, but Suffren had her port anchor and hawsepipe carried away and a  hole punched in her hull that forced her to return to port for emergency repairs.

World War I

When the Marine Nationale mobilized in anticipation of war on 1 August, the Division de complément was ordered to Algiers, French Algeria, to protect the convoy route to Metropolitan France. They conducted their first escort mission on 6 August before arriving at Bizerte, French Tunisia, on the 22nd where they began conducting contraband patrols in the Sicilian Narrows. In September Suffren was fitted with additional Barr and Stroud rangefinders near the bridge. Two of these were mounted on transverse rails fore and aft of the bridge. The after bulkhead was removed and the two 100-millimetre guns on the side of the superstructure were moved one deck lower. Guépratte complained that his ships were not well suited to such a mission and he was ordered to take Suffren, the predreadnought  and the torpedo cruiser  to Port Said, Egypt, to escort troop convoys from British India on 23 September. The following day he was ordered to rendezvous with the semi-dreadnought  at the island of Tenedos where he was to place himself under the orders of the British Vice-Admiral Sackville Carden to assist British ships in blockading the Dardanelles to prevent any sortie by the Ottoman battlecruiser  and the light cruiser  back into the Mediterranean. The Division de complément was renamed the Division des Dardanelles (Dardanelles Division) to reflect its new role. On 3 November the two French battleships joined British ships bombarding the Ottoman fortifications at the mouth of the Dardanelles. The short bombardment by the Allies, during which Suffren fired 30 shells from her main guns, did little damage, but alerted the Ottomans that their defences there required strengthening. After the predreadnought  arrived on 16 November Suffren sailed for Toulon for a lengthy refit.

Dardanelles Campaign

Suffren returned to the Dardanelles on 9 January 1915 and resumed her role as the flagship of the squadron. She bombarded the Ottoman fort of Kum Kale, on the Asiatic side of the strait on 19 February.  assisted Suffren by sending firing corrections via radio while Gaulois provided counter-battery fire to suppress the Ottoman coastal artillery. Late in the day the British predreadnought  was bombarding the fort at Orhaniye Tepe on the Asiatic side of the strait and began taking heavy fire as she approached the fort. The battlecruiser  attempted to suppress the coastal artillery to allow Vengeance to extricate herself, but was unsuccessful. Suffren and Gaulois had to combine their fire with that of Inflexible before Vengeance could successfully withdraw. Suffren fired thirty 305-millimetre shells and 227 shells from her secondary guns during the day.

On 2 March the French squadron bombarded targets in the Gulf of Saros at the base of the Gallipoli Peninsula. On 7 March the French squadron attempted to suppress the Ottoman guns in the Dardanelles while British battleships bombarded the fortifications. Guépratte and his squadron returned to the Gulf of Saros on 11 March where they again bombarded Ottoman fortifications.

They returned to assist in the major attack on the fortifications planned for 18 March. British ships made the initial entry into the Dardanelles, but the French ships passed through them to engage the forts at closer range. Shortly after having done so Suffren was under heavy fire and was struck no less than 14 times in 15 minutes. Most did no significant damage, including a  shell that bounced off the after 305-millimetre turret, but one 24-centimetre shell ricocheted off the port midships 164-millimetre turret and ripped the roof off the port casemate, killing the entire gun crew. Some flaming debris dropped into that gun's magazine and started a fire, but it was quickly flooded to prevent an explosion. While the French squadron was withdrawing pursuant to Admiral John de Robeck's order Bouvet struck a mine and sank in 55 seconds. Suffren lowered her admiral's barge, her only intact boat, and rescued 75 men before she had to escort the badly-damaged Gaulois away from the Dardanelles. The latter was taking on water by the bow and had to be beached on one of the Rabbit Islands at the entrance of the Dardanelles before she sank.

Suffren was ordered to escort Gaulois to Toulon via Malta on 25 March. Two days later the ships encountered a storm and were forced to seek refuge in the Bay of Navarin. Suffren arrived at Toulon on 3 April and was repaired by 20 May when she returned to the Dardanelles to provide gunfire support for the troops ashore. She remained in the area until 31 December; upon returning to her anchorage at Kefalos on the island of Kos, she collided with and sank the British steamer Saint Oswald, a horse transport involved in the evacuation from Gallipoli, and was badly damaged. Suffren arrived in Toulon on 20 January 1916 for repairs which were completed by April. That month she joined the French squadron of six predreadnoughts assigned to prevent any interference by the Greeks with Allied operations on the Salonica front. On 9 July Suffren briefly became flagship of the reestablished 3e Escadre de ligne when Patrie departed for a refit at Toulon. With the creation of a rival pro-Entente government in Greece in August, the Entente became concerned that the royal government might interfere with its use of Greek ports in October as King Constantine I endeavored to maintain Greek neutrality. On 7 October Patrie, Démocratie, and Suffren entered the harbour of Eleusina prepared to fire on the Greek predreadnoughts ,  and the cruiser , but things were resolved peacefully and the French ships returned to their base.

Suffren was originally intended to refit at the naval base at Bizerte, but the location was switched when the dockyard at Lorient informed the Naval Staff that it had room for her. On 15 November the ship departed to recoal at Bizerte which she reached on 18 November. She sailed on 20 November for Gibraltar; heavy weather en route delayed her arrival until 23 November. Suffren recoaled and departed Gibraltar the following day without an escort. The torpedo detonated a magazine and Suffren sank within seconds, taking her entire crew of 648 with her. U-52 searched the scene, but found no survivors.

Notes

References

Further reading

External links

Suffren at Battleships-Cruisers.co.uk
Navies of World War I: French Navy

Battleships of the French Navy
Ships built in France
1899 ships
Maritime incidents in 1907
World War I battleships of France
Maritime incidents in 1916
Shipwrecks of Portugal
World War I shipwrecks in the Atlantic Ocean
Ships sunk by German submarines in World War I
Ships with Field tube boilers
Warships lost in combat with all hands
Naval magazine explosions